Miguelete Creek is a Uruguayan stream, crossing Montevideo Department. It flows into the Bay of Montevideo and then into the Río de la Plata. It has a very significant history behind, since colonial times.

Near its shores are located the big urban park known as Prado and the historical Juan Manuel Blanes Museum.

See also
List of rivers of Uruguay

References

Rivers of Uruguay
Rivers of Montevideo Department
Prado, Montevideo
Capurro